The following is a list of members of the American Academy of Arts and Sciences from 2006 to 2019.

2006 

Larry Abbott
Floyd Abrams
Linda Abriola
Daron Acemoglu
Peter Ackroyd
Leonard Adleman
Charles R. Alcock
Alan Alda
Dudley Andrew
Donald Andrews
Joshua Angrist
Richard N. Aslin
David Awschalom
Ian Ayres
Robert Badinter
Subir Kumar Banerjee
Dean P. Baquet
Nathaniel Beck
Harry Berger, Jr.
Charles Bernstein
Randolph Blake
Jeffrey Bluestone
Lawrence D. Bobo
Dale L. Boger
Michael Botchan
Peter A. Brooke
Christopher R. Browning
Maurizio Brunori
Robert Alan Buhrman
Kevin Peter Campbell
Stephen R. Carpenter
Marshall N. Carter
Jeff Cheeger
Kenneth Irvine Chenault
Judith Chevalier
Shu Chien
Keith Christiansen
Don W. Cleveland
William Jefferson Clinton
Phyllis D. Coley
John M. Connors, Jr.
Susan N. Coppersmith
William J. Cronon
Michael C. Dawson
Eugenia Maria del Pino Veintimilla
Savas Dimopoulos
Rita F. Dove
Denis Duboule
David Eisenbud
Solomon Walter Englander
Lee Epstein
Richard H. Fallon Jr.
Kit Fine
Barbara J. Finlayson-Pitts
Joachim Frank
Margaret Tatnall Fuller
Takashi Gojobori
Michael Ellis Goldberg
Matthew Goldstein
Martin Golubitsky
Michael F. Goodchild
William A. Graham
Jack P. Greene
Bryan Thomas Grenfell
Mark Groudine
Anil K. Gupta
Peter Haggett
William R. Hambrecht
Lee Herbert Hamilton
Pierre Hassner
Reid Hastie
David Haussler
R. Scott Hawley
James William Head III
Benjamin Walter Heineman, Jr.
Robert Willis Hellwarth
E. Tory Higgins
Darlene Clark Hine
Helen Haskell Hobbs
James Oliver Horton
Judith Temkin Irvine
Yoh Iwasa
Kenneth T. Jackson
Richard Charles Murray Janko
Xuefei Jin
Kenneth Kaushansky
Thomas H. Kean
Mark Taylor Keating
Rachel Keen
Richard Kieckhefer
David R. Knechtges
Larry D. Kramer
Richard Kraut
Dominick C. LaCapra
David A. Lake
Robert K. Lazarsfeld
Joseph E. LeDoux
Lawrence Lessig
Henry Allen Lester
Arthur Elliott Levine
Phillip Lopate
Henri Loyrette
Robert W. Mahley
James L. Manley
Lynne E. Maquat
J. Andrew McCammon
Susan K. McConnell
Steven E. Miller
Meredith Monk
Nancy A. Moran
Franco Moretti
Margaret Mary Murnane
Michael Murrin
Victor Saul Navasky
Nora S. Newcombe
Charles M. Newman
Stephen Nickell
Abraham Nitzan
Guust Nolet
Peter J. Novick
Paul Maxime Nurse
Nai Phuan Ong
George F. Oster
Robert Eugene Page, Jr.
David Andrew Patterson
Victor Pérez-Díaz
Kenneth L. Pomeranz
Keith T. Poole
Andrew Postlewaite
Anne Litle Poulet
David Remnick
Geraldine L. Richmond
Bridget Riley
John Glover Roberts, Jr.
John E. Roemer
David Romer
Robert David Sack
Edward D. Salmon
Anneila Isabel Sargent
Barbara Anna Schaal
Martin Scorsese
Lore Segal
Peter Sellars
Stephen H. Shenker
Gordon Murray Shepherd
Choon Fong Shih
James Lauriston Skinner
Amos Brittain Smith III
Nahum Sonenberg
Helen Bowdoin Spaulding
Charles S. Spencer
Charles S. Stanish
James H. Stock
Timothy Manning Swager
Michael Tilson Thomas
Wilma Stein Tisch
Craig A. Tracy
George F. Vande Woude
Pravin P. Varaiya
Paula Vogel
Ellen Bryant Voigt
Rosmarie Waldrop
Mary C. Waters
Seth Paul Waxman
Leslie H. Wexner
Harold Widom
Nicholas Wolterstorff

2007 

 Rosalie Silberman Abella
 Hector Daniel Abruna
 Akhil Reed Amar
 Nancy C. Andrews
 Roger Angell
 Stephen D. Ansolabehere
 Emanuel Ax
 Renee Baillargeon
 John Banville
 Brenda L. Bass
 Bonnie Lynn Bassler
 Aaron T. Beck
 Alexis T. Bell
 Frank A. Bennack, Jr.
 Philip P. Betancourt
 Rosina M. Bierbaum
 David Gordon Blackbourn
 Michael R. Bloomberg
 Lee Bontecou
 Donald Bren
 Rodney Brooks
 Donald E. Brownlee
 Madeline Harrison Caviness
 Arup K. Chakraborty
 Aram V. Chobanian
 F. Michael Christ
 Michael J. Colacurcio
 Jerry Allen Coyne
 Nancy L. Craig
 David Cutler
 Jacques d'Amboise
 Alan M. Dachs
 William James Dally
 Titia de Lange
 David J. DeWitt
 Tom D. Dillehay
 Michael Vincent Drake
 Persis Sydney Drell
 Darrell Duffie
 Christopher F. Edley, Jr.
 Glenn Ellison
 Stephen T. Emlen
 John A. Endler
 Robert S. Erikson
 Gøsta Esping-Andersen
 Deborah Estrin
 Margot E. Fassler
 Ernst Fehr
 Lawrence K. Fish
 Karl Frederick Freed
 Kenneth R. French
 Gregory Chung-Wei Fu
 Susan Gal
 John A. Goldsmith
 Bernard M. Gordon
 Albert A. Gore, Jr.
 Anthony G. Greenwald
 Robert L. Griess, Jr.
 Patricia Hampl
 Douglas Hanahan
 Pat Hanrahan
 Henry Hansmann
 Robert Pogue Harrison
 David Harvey
 Barton Ford Haynes
 Geoffrey Paul Hellman
 Lars Hernquist
 Avram Hershko
 Barry Hirsh Honig
 Herbert Hovenkamp
 Ehud Hrushovski
 Raymond B. Huey
 Thomas J.R. Hughes
 Isabel Virginia Hull
 Lily Y. Jan
 Yuh Nung Jan
 Alexander Dixon Johnson
 William L. Jorgensen
 James W. Jorgenson
 Alexandra Leigh Joyner
 Victor Kac
 Peter Michael Kareiva
 Pamela Susan Karlan
 Haig H. Kazazian, Jr.
 Evelyn Fox Keller
 Chaitan Khosla
 Jon M. Kleinberg
 Christof Koch
 Remment Koolhaas
 J. Michael Kosterlitz
 Robert Andrew Lamb
 Charles Hunt Langley
 John Lasseter
 Spike Lee
 Thomas W. Lentz
 David F. Levi
 Peter Wai-Kwong Li
 Arthur Lupia
 Terry Magnuson
 Juan Martin Maldacena
 Gail Mandel
 N. Gregory Mankiw
 Lawrence G. Manley
 W. James McNerney, Jr.
 Jerry M. Melillo
 Morton H. Meyerson
 James Charles Moeser
 Errol Mark Morris
 Tomasz Stanislaw Mrowka
 Venkatesh Narayanamurti
 Alan Needleman
 Aryeh Neier
 Norman P. Neureiter
 Whitney K. Newey
 Richard G. Niemi
 Arto Veikko Nurmikko
 Michel Claudio Nussenzweig
 Sandra Day O'Connor
 Baldomero M. Olivera
 Moshe Oren
 Michael Ortiz
 E. Roger Owen
 Nell Irvin Painter
 Luis Fernando Parada
 Terence Dwight Parsons
 Nicholas Beaver Penny
 Peter C. Perdue
 Saul Perlmutter
 Michael Petrides
 Robert B. Pippin
 Helen M. Piwnica-Worms
 Stephen B. Pope
 Mary Eleanor Power
 Yvonne Rainer
 George Ranney
 Peter J. Ratcliffe
 M. Thomas Record
 Elsa M. Redmond
 Steve Reich
 William K. Reilly
 Richard L. Revesz
 Marcia J. Rieke
 James E. Risen
 Arthur Rock
 Frances McCall Rosenbluth
 Joshua Richard Sanes
 Aldo Schiavone
 Stephen Schiffer
 Peter H. Schiller
 Eric Schmidt
 Steven A. Schroeder
 John Henry Schwarz
 John Patrick Shanley
 Judith R. Shapiro
 John Shattuck
 David E. Shaw
 Martin Jay Sherwin
 Nanako Shigesada
 Debora Kuller Shuger
 James H. Sidanius
 Richard Sieburth
 Wilfried Sieg
 Joseph I. Silk
 Linda B. Smith
 James M. Snyder, Jr.
 Dan Sperber
 John Lee Spudich
 Stephen Stamas
 Robert A. M. Stern
 Robert M. Stroud
 John L. Sullivan
 Lino Tagliapietra
 Michael Eugene Taylor
 Jeremy W. Thorner
 John L. Thornton
 Billie Tsien
 William Lawrence Twining
 Mitsuko Uchida
 Joan Selverstone Valentine
 Brian William Vickers
 Kenneth L. Wallach
 Alice Waters
 Margaret Weir
 Susan R. Wessler
 Bruce Western
 David R. Williams
 Michael J. Williams
 Tod Williams
 Timothy Williamson
 Mark L. Wilson
 James Wood
 Edward L. Wright
 Wu Hung
 Junying Yuan
 Viviana A. Zelizer
 Robert J. Zimmer

2008 

 Berni Julian Alder
 Pedro Almodóvar
 Marin Alsop
 Elizabeth S. Anderson
 Susan C. Athey
 Robert Hamilton Austin
 Barbara A. Baird
 Ruzena Bajcsy
 James A. Baker III
 Mahzarin Banaji
 Utpal Banerjee
 Zdenek P. Bazant
 Peter S. Bearman
 Mary Catherine Beckerle
 Alexander A. Beilinson
 Charles R. Beitz
 Graeme I. Bell
 Nuel Belnap
 Simon Blackburn
 Mel Bochner
 Janet Elizabeth Browne
 Gerald L. Bruns
 Benjamin H.D. Buchloh
 Linda Brown Buck
 Lawrence Buell
 Brook H. Byers
 Emily Ann Carter
 Jorge G. Castaneda
 Sun-Yung Alice Chang
 Aaron Judah Ciechanover
 Fred E. Cohen
 Tobias Colding
 Linda S. Cordell
 France A. Cordóva
 Nancy F. Cott
 Peter Robert Crane
 Christopher C. Cummins
 Lauren B. Dachs
 Frans B.M. de Waal
 Pablo Gaston Debenedetti
 Eddie Dekel
 Michael Saul Dell
 Michael Hughes Dickinson
 Elizabeth Diller
 John Herbert Dirks
 Michael John Donoghue
 Vladimir Drinfeld
 Jorge Durand
 Alessandro Duranti
 Cynthia Dwork
 John V. Fleming
 Helene Peet Foley
 Richard Norman Foster
 Daniel Frenkel
 Richard A. Friesner
 Susan A. Gelman
 Charles M. Geschke
 Michael E. Geyer
 Daniel Todd Gilbert
 Lawrence Steven Goldstein
 Roger H. Gordon
 Mark Granovetter
 Jerome Groopman
 Alan D. Grossman
 Timothy L. Grove
 Jonathan Gruber
 Samuel Gubins
 John Guckenheimer
 David Hammons
 Philip C. Hanawalt
 Larry V. Hedges
 Richard H. Herman
 John Eyres Hobbie
 Mark A. Horowitz
 James Thomas Hynes
 Jeffrey R. Immelt
 John E. Jackson
 Jainendra Kumar Jain
 Rakesh K. Jain
 Klavs Flemming Jensen
 Edward P. Jones
 Stathis N. Kalyvas
 Harvey Jules Karten
 James Fraser Kasting
 Marc Aaron Kastner
 David Kazhdan
 Mark Gregory Kelman
 David A. Kenny
 Peter S. Kim
 Mark Kirkpatrick
 Richard D. Kolodner
 Carol L. Krumhansl
 John Kuriyan
 William M. Landes
 Bruno Latour
 John H. Lawton
 Thorne Lay
 Mitchell Avery Lazar
 G. Peter Lepage
 Alan Miller Leslie
 Marsha I. Lester
 Arthur D. Levinson
 Thomas Evan Levy
 Earl Lewis
 Judy Lieberman
 David J. Lipman
 Stephen Lisberger
 Milton Lodge
 George Loewenstein
 Nikos K. Logothetis
 Tom C. Lubensky
 Thom Mayne
 Craig Cameron Mello
 William I. Miller
 Timothy J. Mitchison
 Jeffrey Scott Moore
 Glenn W. Most
 Riccardo Muti
 Diana Carole Mutz
 Eiichi Nakamura
 Gülru Necipoğlu
 Indra Nooyi
 Calvin Normore
 Peter O'Donnell, Jr.
 Piermaria J. Oddone
 John Tinsley Oden
 Robert Orsi
 Thomas R. Palfrey III
 Orhan Pamuk
 Louis A. Perez, Jr.
 Norbert Perrimon
 Richard H. Pildes
 James D. Plummer
 Theodore M. Porter
 James L. Powell
 Louis J. Ptacek
 David C. Queller
 David Louis Quint
 Jean-Michel Rabaté
 Margaret Jane Radin
 Richard F. Rashid
 Jeffrey Victor Ravetch
 Charles Richardson Ray
 Paul G. Richards
 Adam G. Riess
 Jasper Rine
 Anne Walters Robertson
 Daniel Rodgers
 Patrick G. Ryan
 Paul Sagan
 Scott D. Sagan
 Pedro A. Sanchez
 David T. Sandwell
 Jose Sarukhan Kermez
 Lynne Sharon Schwartz
 Joan Wallach Scott
 Marlan Orvil Scully
 Reva Beth Siegel
 Debora Leah Silverman
 James H. Simons
 Charles Simonyi
 Yuri Slezkine
 Henry I. Smith
 Raymond W. Smith
 Haim Sompolinsky
 Jeremy C. Stein
 John Paul Stevens
 Thomas F. Steyer
 Bruce William Stillman
 Susan Carol Stokes
 Jeffrey Lee Stout
 Joan E. Strassmann
 Kevin Struhl
 David Frederick Swensen
 Alan Trachtenberg
 Richard Tuttle
 Dawn Upshaw
 C. Megan Urry
 Ewine Fleur van Dishoeck
 Daniel Vasella
 James W. Vaupel
 Michael J. Wade
 John E. Warnock
 Elizabeth Warren
 Fiona Mary Watt
 Ernest Weinrib
 Michael D. Whinston
 Margaret C. Whitman
 Huntington Faxon Willard
 Elliot R. Wolfson
 Robert Wuthnow
 Yehudi Wyner
 Xiaoliang Sunney Xie
 Melinda A. Zeder
 Leonard Ira Zon

2009 

 Abul K. Abbas
 Andrew Abbott
 Kenneth S. Abraham
 Sankar L. Adhya
 Nancy E. Adler
 David A. Agard
 Philippe Aghion
 Danielle Allen
 Karl P. Ameriks
 Nima Arkani-Hamed
 Stevan James Arnold
 Peter S. Aronson
 David Baker
 Spencer Charles Hilton Barrett
 Kenny Barron
 Eric E. Becklin
 G. Vann Bennett
 Robert Berne
 Mary Elizabeth Berry
 Spencer Janney Bloch
 Patrick Bolton
 H. Kim Bottomly
 Marianne Bronner
 John Seely Brown
 Rogers Brubaker
 Cynthia J. Burrows
 Mario R. Capecchi
 Richard Walter Carlson
 Robert A. Caro
 Sean B. Carroll
 John T. Casteen III
 Richard E. Cavanagh
 Mary Ann Caws
 Michael Chabon
 Eric L. Charnov
 Jennifer Alice Clack
 Louis Geoffrey Cowan
 Stanley Crouch
 James S. Crown
 Hongjie Dai
 D. Ronald Daniel
 Ronald J. Daniels
 Dennis Russell Davies
 Karen Davis
 Judy S. DeLoache
 Mahlon Robert DeLong
 Judi Dench
 Mathias Dewatripont
 Paul J. DiMaggio
 John Doerr
 John J. Donohue III
 Esther Duflo
 James Anthony Dumesic
 Scott Vernon Edwards
 William Eggleston
 Richard Eisenberg
 John (Jaś) Elsner
 Carl William Ernst
 Paul Edward Farmer
 Robert A. Fefferman
 Andrew Paul Feinberg
 Paul J. Ferri
 Eduardo Hector Fradkin
 John R. Freeman
 Benjamin M. Friedman
 Robert Michael Gates
 William Michael Gelbart
 Ronald M. George
 Alan S. Gerber
 Robert S. Gibbons
 H. Charles J. Godfray
 Dorian Goldfeld
 Simon D. Goldhill
 Ursula W. Goodenough
 Edith M. Grossman
 Jane I. Guyer
 James E. Haber
 Bradford H. Hager
 Naomi J. Halas
 Jeffrey Hamburger
 Ann Katherine Hamilton
 Emmylou Harris
 Lene Vestergaard Hau
 Daniel Murray Hausman
 Kristen Hawkes
 Michael Heizer
 Adam Heller
 Tina M. Henkin
 Deborah R. Hensler
 Paul David Hewson
 Eve J. Higginbotham
 Alan G. Hinnebusch
 Dustin Hoffman
 Douglas R. Hofstadter
 Craig James Hogan
 Marilyn Horne
 Guido W. Imbens
 Ronald F. Inglehart
 Mary Jane Irwin
 Matthew O. Jackson
 Stein Bjornar Jacobsen
 Gish Jen
 Mark A. Johnson
 James Earl Jones
 William Chester Jordan
 Nancy Kanwisher
 Aharon Kapitulnik
 Alice Y. Kaplan
 Mehran Kardar
 Guinevere Alice Mei-ing Kauffmann
 Rashid Khalidi
 Jamaica Kincaid
 Michael J. Klarman
 Maria Klawe
 J. David Konstan
 Kent Kresa
 Jon A. Krosnick
 Ray Kurzweil
 Barbara Landau
 Michael John Laver
 T.J. Jackson Lears
 Michael George Longley
 Steven Gwon Sheng Louie
 Thomas E. Mallouk
 Carol Caruso Mancusi-Ungaro
 Maxine L. Margolis
 Dale Basil Martin
 James M. McPherson
 Andrew N. Meltzoff
 Theodor Meron
 Cathy E. Minehan
 Malcolm Morley
 J. Anthony Movshon
 Elizabeth G. Nabel
 W. James Nelson
 Guy Jérôme Pierre Nordenson
 Patrick H. O'Farrell
 Kate O'Regan
 Pierre Omidyar
 Jose Nelson Onuchic
 Lelio Orci
 H. Allen Orr
 Susan Packard Orr
 Bernard Osher
 Stanley J. Osher
 Julie E. Packard
 Stuart Stephen Papworth Parkin
 Edward E. Penhoet
 Philip Noel Pettit
 Aron Pinczuk
 A. Stephen Polasky
 Joseph William Polisi
 Ross Posnock
 Colin Luther Powell
 Itamar Rabinovich
 Raghuram G. Rajan
 Anjana Rao
 Nicholas Rescher
 Deborah L. Rhode
 Mark J. Roe
 Theodore C. Rogers
 Ares J. Rosakis
 Robert Rosenthal
 John W. Rowe
 Gary B. Ruvkun
 Matthew S. Santirocco
 Jonathan D. Sarna
 Caleb Powell Haun Saussy
 Ricardo Scofidio
 Steven Shapin
 Neil H. Shubin
 Beth Ann Simmons
 Robert H. Singer
 Michael Sipser
 Dan I. Slobin
 Alfred Z. Spector
 Susan Levitt Stamberg
 Stephen Peter Stich
 Karen B. Strier
 Sanjay Subrahmanyam
 Attila Szabo
 Strobe Talbott
 Terence Tao
 Volker ter Meulen
 Philip Eyrikson Tetlock
 Romila Thapar
 Edwin Lorimer Thomas
 Matthew Tirrell
 John Merrill Toole
 Emilie M. Townes
 James William Truman
 Gunther Uhlmann
 Edward Villella
 Robert von Hallberg
 Claes von Hofsten
 James Warren Wagner
 Warren Morton Washington
 David E. Wellbery
 James V. Wertsch
 Gary L. Westbrook
 Jennifer Widom
 J. Harvie Wilkinson III
 John Williams
 Ruth J. Williams
 Timothy D. Wilson
 Tobias Wolff
 Wong Kar Wai
 Donald E. Worster
 Martin F. Yanofsky
 Ruth Bernard Yeazell
 Wayne M. Yokoyama
 Peter Zumthor

2010 

 Ervand Abrahamian
 Edward H. Adelson
 Larissa Adler-Lomnitz
 Richard B. Alley
 Joseph G. Altonji
 Christiane M. Amanpour
 Philip S. Anderson
 Joseph E. Aoun
 Yitzhak Apeloig
 Robert Scott Appleby
 Kathryn A. Bard
 Samuel H. Barondes
 Frank S. Bates
 Andrea Louise Bertozzi
 Michael Blackwood
 Gene D. Block
 Thomas Blumenthal
 Carles Boix
 Manuel J. Borja-Villel
 Leo Braudy
 Robert Paul Brenner
 David B. Brooks
 Randal E. Bryant
 Louise Henry Bryson
 Valerie Jane Bunce
 Adam Seth Burrows
 Ricardo J. Caballero
 Harvey Cantor
 Sunney I. Chan
 G. Marius Clore
 Gerald L. Clore
 G. Wayne Clough
 Henri Cole
 Jonathan Jay Cole
 Ruth Berins Collier
 Peter S. Constantin
 Robert Graham Cooks
 Francis Ford Coppola
 John M. Cornish
 Scott S. Cowen
 Harvey Gallagher Cox, Jr.
 Peter Cresswell
 Carlo M. Croce
 Charles E. Curran
 Stuart A. Curran
 Ruth S. DeFries
 John J. DeGioia
 Ronald Anthony DePinho
 Susan Desmond-Hellmann
 Michael Dine
 David G. Drubin
 Jon Michael Dunn
 Susan K. Dutcher
 Lynn W. Enquist
 Martha Julia Farah
 Shoshana Felman
 Frances Ferguson
 Roger W. Ferguson, Jr.
 David Sean Ferriero
 David L. Ferster
 Christopher Bower Field
 Howard Lincoln Fields
 Neil D. Fligstein
 Donald W. Forsyth
 Hal Foster
 Joseph S. Francisco
 Paul Harris Freedman
 Joaquin M. Fuster
 Robert L. Gallucci
 Don Garrett
 Samuel H. Gellman
 Mark Gertler
 Edward Ludwig Glaeser
 Gary A. Glatzmaier
 William A. Goddard III
 Nigel David Goldenfeld
 Arthur L. Goldstein
 Jan E. Goldstein
 Michael Marc Gottesman
 Daniel E. Gottschling
 Greg Grandin
 Mark Lee Green
 Robert M. Groves
 Martin Gruebele
 Thomas Gunning
 John L. Hagan
 David Haig
 Benjamin D. Hall
 Andrew D. Hamilton
 Thomas Hampson
 Haim Harari
 Richard M. Harland
 Carla A. Hesse
 Ray W. Hilborn
 Charles O. Holliday, Jr.
 Daniel Walker Howe
 Ronald R. Hoy
 Evelyn L. Hu
 David Huse
 Toyo Ito
 James Sidney Jackson
 John Calvin Jeffries, Jr.
 John I. Jenkins
 Joseph B. Kadane
 Mark N. Kaplan
 Henry Kaufman
 Michael A. Keller
 Kathleen Kennedy
 Jim Yong Kim
 Karla Kirkegaard
 Robert E. Kottwitz
 Martin E. Kreitman
 Kurt Lambeck
 Jaime Laredo
 Chung K. Law
 James Leach
 Mike Leigh
 Nicholas B. Lemann
 Neil Levine
 Michael Levitt
 Timothy J. Ley
 John A. Lithgow
 Roderick J. Little
 Andrea J. Liu
 Nancy Ann Lynch
 Paul G. Mahoney
 Scott P. Mainwaring
 Andrew J. Majda
 Jose Maria Maravall
 Geoffrey W. Marcy
 Robert D. Mare
 James Henry Marrow
 Steve Martin
 Michel G. Mayor
 Nolan McCarty
 William J. McGinnis
 Donald W. Meinig
 Peter Istvan Meszaros
 Jerald T. Milanich
 Parviz Moin
 James Michael Moran
 Richard A. Muller
 Gary Jan Nabel
 Carol C. Nadelson
 Gerald L. Neuman
 Olufunmilayo I. Olopade
 Monica Olvera de la Cruz
 Raymond E. Ozzie
 Samuel J. Palmisano
 Roy R. Parker
 Linda Partridge
 Christopher A. B. Peacocke
 Wolfgang Pesendorfer
 Richard Edward Petty
 Barry R. Posen
 Eric Posner
 Kimberly Ann Prather
 William L. Rawn III
 David E. Robertson
 Marilynne S. Robinson
 Sonny Rollins
 Thomas F. Rosenbaum
 Loren R. Rothschild
 Emmanuel S. Saez
 Esa-Pekka Salonen
 Marjorie M. Scardino
 Morton Schapiro
 Alanna Schepartz
 David Schmeidler
 Johanna M. Schmitt
 Myron S. Scholes
 Liev Schreiber
 Robert David Schreiber
 Gary M. Segura
 David N. Seidman
 Laurence Philip Senelick
 Freydoon Shahidi
 Jalal Shatah
 Marc Shell
 Seana Shiffrin
 Robert J. Shimer
 Roberto Sierra
 Richard S. Slotkin
 Catherine E. Snow
 Scott Soames
 Joel Sobel
 Deepak Srivastava
 Arnold Steinhardt
 Garrett Stewart
 Brian Charles Alexander Stock
 Michael Stonebraker
 Peter L. Strauss
 Susan Strome
 Madhu Sudan
 Thomas C. Sudhof
 Ratan N. Tata
 John N. Thompson
 Loa P. Traxler
 Luis A. Ubinas
 Moshe Y. Vardi
 Ernest Borisovich Vinberg
 Heinrich von Staden
 Gunter P. Wagner
 Bruce D. Walker
 Denzel Washington
 David A. Weitz
 Mary Fanett Wheeler
 John Warren Wilkins
 Forman A. Williams
 Rowan Douglas Williams
 James R. Williamson
 Jeannette M. Wing
 Fred M. Winston
 Elisabeth Jean Wood
 Craig M. Wright
 Philip G. Zimbardo
 Jan M. Ziolkowski
 Maciej R. Zworski

2011 

 Richard Warren Aldrich
 Victor Ambros
 Luc E. Anselin
 Frances Hamilton Arnold
 Wanda M. Austin
 Jesse Huntley Ausubel
 Thomas Banks
 John Andrew Bargh
 Mary Beard
 Anna Katherine Behrensmeyer
 Roland J. M. Benabou
 Marsha J. Berger
 Timothy J. Besley
 Philip V. Bohlman
 Anthony S. Bryk
 John E. Bryson
 Kenneth L. Burns
 R. Paul Butler
 Elizabeth J. Cabraser
 Thomas P. Campbell
 James Ireland Cash, Jr.
 Francisco G. Cigarroa
 Edmund Melson Clarke
 James Clifford
 Geoffrey W. Coates
 Ernest H. Cockrell
 Timothy J. Colton
 Robert K. Colwell
 David Paul Corey
 Stanley A. Corngold
 George William Crabtree
 Robert Howard Crabtree
 Peter W. Culicover
 George Q. Daley
 Chi Van Dang
 Marcetta Y. Darensbourg
 Daniel Day-Lewis
 Juan José de Pablo
 David de Rothschild
 Raymond J. Deshaies
 Vishva Dixit
 Edward P. Djerejian
 John P. Donoghue
 Steven Neil Durlauf
 Bob Dylan
 Penelope Eckert
 Jonathan A. Epstein
 Alex Eskin
 Edward W. Felten
 Russell Dawson Fernald
 Martha Finnemore
 Claude S. Fischer
 Philip Fisher
 Nancy Foner
 Catherine S. Fowler
 Scott E. Fraser
 Joseph Francis Fraumeni, Jr.
 Glenn H. Fredrickson
 Julio Frenk
 Sarah Fuller
 Thomas W. Gaehtgens
 Franklin I. Gamwell
 Daniel E. Garber
 Sylvester James Gates, Jr.
 Sharon C. Glotzer
 Annette Gordon-Reed
 Maxwell E. Gottesman
 Hugh Grant
 Paul Anthony Griffiths
 Sol Michael Gruner
 John Guare
 Robert D. Haas
 Daniel Arie Haber
 Jacquelyn Dowd Hall
 Ray A. Hammond
 Martin P. Head-Gordon
 Jeffrey J. Henderson
 Robert F. Higgins
 Katherine Ann High
 Okihide Hikosaka
 Edward Hoagland
 E. Brooks Holifield
 Jenny Holzer
 Eric Joel Horvitz
 Thomas Yizhao Hou
 Leah H. Jamieson
 Jay H. Jasanoff
 W. Thomas Johnson, Jr.
 Alex S. Jones
 Michael I. Jordan
 Marcel Kahan
 Frances Myrna Kamm
 Linda P.B. Katehi
 Kazuya Kato
 Jonathan N. Katz
 Thomas Forrest Kelly
 J. Mark Kenoyer
 Talmadge Everett King, Jr.
 Robert E. Kingston
 Joseph Klafter
 Steven Knapp
 Robert Kraft
 David I. Laibson
 Chester Charles Langway, Jr.
 Lewis Lee Lanier
 L. Gary Leal
 Andrei Dmitriyevich Linde
 John A. List
 Beatrice Longuenesse
 William Roger Louis
 Todd Joseph Martínez
 Raghunath A. Mashelkar
 Mark A. Mazower
 Bill McKibben
 H. Jay Melosh
 Louis Menand
 Geoffrey P. Miller
 Jeffrey H. Miller
 Chad A. Mirkin
 Helen Mirren
 Margaret M. Mitchell
 Gregory Winthrop Moore
 W. Jason Morgan
 Richard I. Morimoto
 Ellen Mosley-Thompson
 Shree K. Nayar
 William Barlow Neaves
 Ei-ichi Negishi
 Angelika Neuwirth
 Katherine S. Newman
 Svante Pääbo
 David Conrad Page
 Scott E. Page
 David G. Pearce
 Monika Piazzesi
 Hugh David Politzer
 Trevor Douglas Price
 Peter B. Reich
 Robert D. Reischauer
 David N. Reznick
 Adam Roberts
 Malcolm Austin Rogers
 Thomas Romer
 C. Brian Rose
 Rodney J. Rothstein
 Martine F. Roussel
 Roberta L. Rudnick
 David W. Russell
 Laurent Saloff-Coste
 Larry Samuelson
 Michael Scammell
 Michael H. Schill
 Amita Sehgal
 Louis Michael Seidman
 Sybil Putnam Seitzinger
 Patricia Griffiths Selinger
 Eric U. Selker
 James S. Shapiro
 Kevan M. Shokat
 Peter Williston Shor
 Paul Simon
 David J. Skorton
 Bruce David Smith
 Eduardo Elisio Machado Souto de Moura
 Debora L. Spar
 Gabrielle M. Spiegel
 Charles Haines Stewart III
 Howard A. Stone
 Gisela T. Storz
 Thomas J. Sugrue
 Wesley I. Sundquist
 Michael K. Tanenhaus
 Ann Taves
 Herbert F. Tucker
 Christopher R. Udry
 Luisa Valenzuela
 Michael R. Van Valkenburgh
 J. Mario Pedro Vargas Llosa
 Lothar von Falkenhausen
 Brian A. Wandell
 Jean Yin Jen Wang
 Samuel A. Waterston
 Sandra Robin Waxman
 Barbara Weinstein
 Henry S. White, Jr.
 Miles D. White
 Marvin Pete Wickens
 Avi Wigderson
 Robert Wilson
 Hisashi Yamamoto
 Stephen C. Yeazell
 Shigeyuki Yokoyama
 Yuk Ling Yung
 James C. Zachos
 Shou-Wu Zhang

2012 

 Arvind
 Gabriel Aeppli
 Ken L. Alder
 Eva Y. Andrei
 Ann Margaret Arvin
 David Autor
 Martin D. Baron
 George F. Bass
 Kamaljit Singh Bawa
 Angela M. Belcher
 Christopher Benfey
 Barry George Bergdoll
 Bonnie Berger
 James M. Berger
 Marianne Bertrand
 Jeffrey Preston Bezos
 Sven P. Birkerts
 Joan S. Lyttle Birman
 Meredith May Blackwell
 David William Blight
 Jef D. Boeke
 Paul Artin Boghossian
 Elizabeth Hill Boone
 Michael E. Bratman
 Philip N. Bredesen
 Emery Neal Brown
 James Allison Brown
 Caroline Astrid Bruzelius
 Philip Howard Bucksbaum
 John P. Burgess
 R. Nicholas Burns
 Russel E. Caflisch
 Edward Matthew Callaway
 John M. Carey
 John R. Carlson
 Edward G. Carmines
 Robert Leonard Carneiro
 Katharine Venable Cashman
 Hans Clevers
 Hillary Rodham Clinton
 Lizabeth Cohen
 Jared Leigh Cohon
 James Joseph Collins
 Robert P. Colwell
 Lawrence Corey
 Tom Curran
 Colin Dayan
 Philippe Descola
 Shari Seidman Diamond
 Edward Francis Diener
 James N. Druckman
 Brian Jay Druker
 Victor J. Dzau
 Alice Hendrickson Eagly
 Clint Eastwood
 Karl W. Eikenberry
 Sarah Carlisle Roberts Elgin
 Laura Engelstein
 Martha Feldman
 Susan Ferro-Novick
 Robert Fettiplace
 Amy Finkelstein
 Joseph J. Fins
 Debra Ann Fischer
 Steven A. Frank
 Kenneth C. Frazier
 Melinda French Gates
 Elisabeth R. Gerber
 Robert H. Giles
 Thomas D. Gilovich
 Midori Gotō
 Carol J. Greenhouse
 Irene Greif
 Robert Guy Griffin
 Sharon Hammes-Schiffer
 David Hare
 Rita Eleanor Hauser
 Philip Andrew Hieter
 Ana Magdalena Hurtado
 Vincent Lamont Hutchings
 Robert A. Iger
 Tyler E. Jacks
 Mark Johnston
 Gerald F. Joyce
 M. Frans Kaashoek
 Steven Michael Kahn
 Daniel Kahne
 Ehud Kalai
 Michael Kearns
 Edmund Francis Kelly
 Dennis V. Kent
 William Kentridge
 Stuart K. Kim
 Shinobu Kitayama
 Igor R. Klebanov
 Steven S. Koblik
 Gary A. Koretzky
 Bruce Kovner
 Mitzi Irene Kuroda
 James A. Lake
 Herbert Levine
 Daryl Levinson
 Reynold Levy
 Jennifer A. Lewis
 Richard P. Lifton
 Thomas Milton Liggett
 Abraham Loeb
 Jonathan B. Losos
 Liqun Luo
 David W.C. MacMillan
 Maureen E. Mahoney
 George J. Mailath
 Terrence Malick
 Thomas Mallon
 Carolyn A. Martin
 Anthony W. Marx
 Diane Mathis
 Kathleen McCartney
 Paul McCartney
 Michael McCormick
 Margaret J. McFall-Ngai
 Michael A. McRobbie
 Daniel Mendelsohn
 Paul Mendes-Flohr
 Jack R. Meyer
 Robert A. Moffitt
 Bao Chau Ngo
 Michael A. North
 John O'Shea
 Gregory B. Olson
 David W. Oxtoby
 Athanassios Z. Panagiotopoulos
 Michele Parrinello
 Judea Pearl
 John Brian Pendry
 Elizabeth Anya Phelps
 Jerry Pinkney
 Bjorn Mikhail Poonen
 Jean Porter
 Andre George Previn
 Penny S. Pritzker
 Jessica Rawson
 Francois Recanati
 L. Rafael Reif
 Danny F. Reinberg
 Matthew White Ridley
 Joseph Roach
 James A. Robinson
 Griffin Platt Rodgers
 Ignacio J. Rodriguez-Iturbe
 Daniel Rose
 Joanna Semel Rose
 David G. Roskies
 Alex Ross
 Eli Ruckenstein
 Vicki L. Ruiz
 Kaija Saariaho
 Bernard Sadoulet
 Scott Russell Sanders
 David T. Scadden
 Dolph Schluter
 W. Ronald Schuchard
 Michael Schudson
 Brenda A. Schulman
 Helmut F. Schwarz
 Jeffrey A. Segal
 Ismail Serageldin
 Robert Martin Seyfarth
 Steven A. Siegelbaum
 Larry Simpson
 Kiki Smith
 David Nathaniel Spergel
 Alicia Elsbeth Stallings
 Maureen L. Stanton
 George Stephanopoulos
 Gerald Stern
 Steve Jefferey Stern
 J. Fraser Stoddart
 Steven H. Strogatz
 Eleonore Stump
 Richard E. Sylla
 Richard Lawrence Taylor
 Alan Robert Templeton
 Rodolfo Hector Terragno
 Augusta Read Thomas
 James S. Tisch
 Marvin Trachtenberg
 Yaacov Trope
 Gina G. Turrigiano
 Jeffrey D. Ullman
 Veronica Vaida
 David Theodore Van Zanten
 Frederica von Stade
 Andrew G. Walder
 Kara Walker
 Sanford I. Weill
 David A. Weisbach
 Henry M. Wellman
 Anthony Welters
 John Haynes Werren
 Christopher Wheeldon
 Keith E. Whittington
 David Brian Wilkins
 Ernest James Wilson III
 Matthew A. Wilson
 Brenda Wineapple
 Judy Woodruff
 Crispin James Garth Wright
 Stephen Yablo
 Eli Yablonovitch
 Peidong Yang
 A. Peter Young
 Alexander B. Zamolodchikov
 Luigi G. Zingales

2013 

 Jonathan C. Abbott
 Anant Agarwal
 Rakesh Agrawal
 Edward Cleveland Aldridge, Jr.
 T. Alexander Aleinikoff
 David Matthew Altshuler
 Arturo Alvarez-Buylla
 Martin Amis
 Meinrat O. Andreae
 Mark Aronoff
 Carmen C. Bambach
 Julian P. Barnes
 Bonnie Bartel
 Cynthia M. Beall
 Henri Berestycki
 Shelley L. Berger
 Wendell E. Berry
 Bruce A. Beutler
 Arthur I. Bienenstock
 Robert Allen Bjork
 Martin J. Blaser
 Kerry Steven Bloom
 Nicholas Bloom
 Xandra Owens Breakefield
 Paul Arthur Buttenwieser
 David E. Cane
 David John Chalmers
 Roz Chast
 Alan D. Code
 David K. Cohen
 Martha Constantine-Paton
 Richard G. Cooke
 Robert De Niro
 Daniel Diermeier
 Robbert H. Dijkgraaf
 David L. Dill
 Annie Dillard
 Emma M. Donoghue
 Douglas Druick
 Janice Eberly
 Mickey H. Edwards
 Susan J. Eggers
 Martin Stewart Eichenbaum
 Elliot Lawrence Elson
 Larry G. Epstein
 Jon McVey Erlandson
 Jeffrey Kent Eugenides
 Donna M. Ferriero
 Sally M. Field
 Michael Fishbane
 Renée Fleming
 Paula Fredriksen
 Jeffrey M. Friedman
 Athol Fugard
 Jed A. Fuhrman
 Thomas B. Ginsburg
 Alison Gopnik
 Paula T. Hammond
 Herbie Hancock
 Philip J. Hanlon
 Serge Haroche
 John Stratton Hawley
 Timothy M. Heckman
 Stephen B. Heintz
 Frances Hellman
 Steven Allen Hillyard
 Robert Dan Holt
 Donald C. Hood
 Gary T. Horowitz
 Frederick E. Hoxie
 John D. Huber
 Glenn H. Hutchins
 Anthony Ragnar Ives
 Simon David Jackman
 Margaret Candee Jacob
 Herve M. Jacquet
 Robert Loren Jaffe
 Christine Jolls
 Dan M. Kahan
 Marc Kamionkowski
 Robert A. Kaster
 Regis B. Kelly
 Kenneth J. Kemphues
 Nancy Knowlton
 Eugene V. Koonin
 Rae Langton
 David Winslow Latham
 Edward O. Laumann
 Sara Lawrence-Lightfoot
 H. Blaine Lawson, Jr.
 Virginia Man-Yee Lee
 Frank Richard Lentricchia
 Naomi Ehrich Leonard
 John G. Levi
 John T. Lis
 Andrew W. Lo
 Joseph Loscalzo
 Scott William Lowe
 James R. Lupski
 Kenneth C. Macdonald
 Stephen Joseph Macedo
 Arun Majumdar
 Jitendra Malik
 Susan L. Mann
 John Francis Manning
 Susan Marqusee
 Alan George Marshall
 Sarah Crawford Maza
 Rose M. McDermott
 David J. Meltzer
 Peter F. Michelson
 D.A. Miller
 Ernest J. Moniz
 Randall T. Moon
 Michael Edward Moseley
 Shaul Mukamel
 Klaus Mullen
 Hitoshi Murayama
 Richard J. Murnane
 Anne-Sophie Mutter
 Charles Alexander Nelson III
 David John Nesbitt
 Marshall D. Newton
 Stephen G. Nichols
 Chrysostomos L. Nikias
 Peter Norvig
 Barbro Sachs Osher
 John A. Parrish
 David M. Perlmutter
 Christopher John Pethick
 Judy Pfaff
 Suzanne Pfeffer
 Duong H. Phong
 William James Poorvu
 Sorin T. Popa
 Jonathan K. Pritchard
 Emily Rauh Pulitzer
 Karin M. Rabe
 Jed S. Rakoff
 Nicholas Read
 Lauren B. Resnick
 Jennifer Rexford
 Ranulfo Romo
 Richard M. Rosenberg
 Mark Rosenzweig
 Edward Rothstein
 David M. Rubenstein
 Teofilo F. Ruiz
 Peter Salovey
 Pamela Samuelson
 Maxine L. Savitz
 Stuart B. Schwartz
 Terrence Joseph Sejnowski
 Geraldine Seydoux
 Charles J. Sherr
 Yigong Shi
 Yoshiaki Shimizu
 Thomas M. Siebel
 Alastair Smith
 Marshall S. Smith
 Michael Andrew Smith
 Bruce Springsteen
 Laurence David Steinberg
 Richard Stoltzman
 Walter A. Strauss
 Ann Swidler
 Richard Alfred Tapia
 Marc Trevor Tessier-Lavigne
 Paul Theroux
 T. Don Tilley
 Natasha D. Trethewey
 Barbara G. Tversky
 Sandra L. Vehrencamp
 David R. Walt
 Leonard Wantchekon
 Michael D. Warner
 Sheldon Weinbaum
 Renata M.M. Wentzcovitch
 Michael C. Whitlock
 Ronald A. Williams
 David Jeffery Wineland
 Phyllis Wise
 Asher Wolinsky
 Kathryn Ann Woolard
 Jerry L. Workman
 Bin Yu
 Xiaowei Zhuang

2014 

 Joanna Aizenberg
 Catherine L. Albanese
 Susan C. Alberts
 Graham T. Allison, Jr.
 El Anatsui
 Dora E. Angelaki
 Manuel Arellano
 Isobel Mair Armstrong
 Neta Assaf Bahcall
 Deborah Loewenberg Ball
 Robert D. Ballard
 Bruce Palmer Bean
 Anthony J. Bebbington
 Graham A.C. Bell
 Karol Berger
 Steven T. Berry
 Hans Dieter Betz
 Nancy Bonini
 John F. Brady
 Michael P. Brenner
 George W. Breslauer
 John Broome
 Michel Broue
 Antonia Susan Byatt
 Walter Cahn
 Charles M. Cameron
 Emmanuel J. Candes
 Gerardo J. Ceballos Gonzalez
 James Kenneth Chandler
 Jennifer Tour Chayes
 Anthony K. Cheetham
 Raj Chetty
 Arul M. Chinnaiyan
 John B. Cobb, Jr.
 Donald Lee Court
 Janet M. Currie
 William V.B. Damon
 Linda Darling-Hammond
 Ken A. Dill
 Nicholas B. Dirks
 Chris Q. Doe
 Johanna Ruth Drucker
 Timothy Earle
 Elazer Reuven Edelman
 Peter P. Edwards
 Christopher L. Eisgruber
 Katherine Theresa Faber
 Ronald Fagin
 Kenneth A. Farley
 Charles Francis Feeney
 Jules Ralph Feiffer
 Margaret W. Ferguson
 Arthur Fine
 James Fishkin
 Garret Adare FitzGerald
 Nathan A. Fox
 Jerry Forest Franklin
 Edward Frenkel
 Tamas F. Freund
 Daniel Harry Friedan
 W. Kent Fuchs
 Inez Fung
 David Gabai
 Adam Gamoran
 Alan Gilbert
 Christopher K. Glass
 Pinelopi K. Goldberg
 Louis M. Gomez
 Andrew David Gordon
 Richard L. Gourse
 R. Jeremy Grantham
 Harry Walter Greene
 Warner Craig Greene
 Patricia Marks Greenfield
 Michael Greenstone
 Linda Gregerson
 Shiv I.S. Grewal
 Lawrence Grossman
 Susan D. Gubar
 Helen Hardacre
 David Harel
 Fiona Anne Harrison
 Nathan Orr Hatch
 Maxwell K. Hearn
 Amy Hempel
 Adam Hochschild
 Wayne Hu
 Robert Huckfeldt
 Donald Frederick Hunt
 Martin Sean Indyk
 John Winslow Irving
 Shanto Iyengar
 Vicki C. Jackson
 Carl H. June
 Eric William Kaler
 Michael Barry Kastan
 Mary C. Kelley
 Richard W. Kenyon
 Ellen D. Ketterson
 William Hugh Kling
 Daphne Koller
 Clifford P. Kubiak
 Thomas A. Kunkel
 Leslie B. Lamport
 Sherry Lee Lansing
 Risa J. Lavizzo-Mourey
 Leslie Anne Leinwand
 Jill Lepore
 Jonathan Levin
 Leonid A. Levin
 Ann Marie Lipinski
 Richard Jay Lipton
 Daniel F. Louvard
 C. Owen Lovejoy
 David J. Luban
 M. Cristina Marchetti
 Kerry James Marshall
 John H.R. Maunsell
 Paula D. McClain
 David A. McCormick
 Michael S. McPherson
 Sabeeha Merchant
 Ruth Garrett Millikan
 James D. Morrow
 Edward Wallace Muir, Jr.
 Susan Naquin
 Keith Adam Nelson
 Tere R. O'Connor
 Peter S. Onuf
 Al Pacino
 Susan Paine
 Peter Palese
 Hermann Parzinger
 Dinshaw J. Patel
 Nikola Panayot Pavletich
 Eric R. Pianka
 Stephen Plog
 Earl Ward Plummer
 Sheldon I. Pollock
 Alvin Francis Poussaint
 George L. Priest
 Thomas J. Pritzker
 E. Annie Proulx
 Stephen R. Quake
 William M. Reddy
 Robert B. Reich
 Elizabeth Jean Reitz
 John Washington Rogers, Jr.
 John Ashley Rogers
 Mendel Rosenblum
 Lee H. Rosenthal
 Amy C. Rosenzweig
 Mary Klevjord Rothbart
 Bernardo Luis Sabatini
 Mary Jo Salter
 Roger W. Sant
 Patti B. Saris
 George William Saunders
 Charles Lazelle Sawyers
 David Gilliam Schatz
 Londa L. Schiebinger
 Paul A. Seidel
 Jaime Sepulveda
 Ramamurti Shankar
 Dan Shechtman
 Richard Bruce Silverman
 Michelle Yvonne Simmons
 M. Celeste Simon
 Elaine Sisman
 Robert Harry Socolow
 Dam Thanh Son
 Pol D. Spanos
 David L. Spector
 Jerry I. Speyer
 Gigliola Staffilani
 Claudio Daniel Stern
 Bryan A. Stevenson
 Marcelo M. Suárez-Orozco
 Robert Suckale
 Daniel Ioan Tataru
 Ngugi wa Thiong'o
 Sarah Elizabeth Thomas
 Sherry Turkle
 Wilfred A. van der Donk
 Robert Dirk van der Hilst
 J. David Velleman
 Geoffrey Myles Wahl
 Diana Harrison Wall
 A. Eugene Washington
 Gary L. Watson
 Carrie Mae Weems
 Paul Storch Weiss
 Janet Feldman Werker
 Rachel I. Wilson
 John C. Wingfield
 John Fabian Witt
 Amanda L. Woodward
 Larry James Young
 Anthony Zee
 Alex K. Zettl

2015 

 Christopher Abani
 David Z. Albert
 Lisa Anderson
 Carl Andre
 Marcia Angell
 Morris S. Arnold
 Sanjeev Arora
 Harold W. Attridge
 Laszlo Babai
 Phil S. Baran
 Nahum Barnea
 Roy F. Baumeister
 Gerard Ben Arous
 Jean Bennett
 David Bercovici
 Ivan T. Berend
 Sangeeta Bhatia
 Lorenzo Gennaro Bianconi
 Sarah A. Binder
 Robert E. Bly
 June Kathryn Bock
 A'Lelia Bundles
 William J. Burns
 Carlos J. Bustamante
 Marc G. Caron
 Kang-i Sun Chang
 Patricia Smith Churchland
 Dante Cicchetti
 Margaret S. Clark
 John Clarke
 Robert E. Cohen
 Judith Marjorie Collins
 Clive M. Cookson
 Holland Cotter
 Thomas B. F. Cummins
 James W. Curran
 Hermann Danuser
 Gary Dell
 Philip J. Deloria
 Joseph L. DeRisi
 Susan T. Dumais
 Geoff Dyer
 Joseph R. Ecker
 Liran Einav
 Peter T. Ellison
 Jonathan A. Ellman
 Michael B. Elowitz
 David Eltis
 Bjorn Engquist
 Anne Fadiman
 Timothy J. Feddersen
 Noah R. Feldman
 Stanley Fields
 Alexei V. Filippenko
 John Freccero
 Igor B. Frenkel
 Roland G. Fryer Jr.
 David W. Garland
 Matthew Gentzkow
 George Georgiou
 Morteza Gharib
 Martin Gilens
 Jane C. Ginsburg
 David D. Ginty
 Thomas J. Greytak
 Terry Gross
 David B. Grusky
 Taekjip Ha
 Laura M. Haas
 Kenji Hakuta
 Joseph Y. Halpern
 Philip Hamburger
 Paul L. Harris
 John F. Hartwig
 Sally Haslanger
 N. Katherine Hayles
 Maurice P. Herlihy
 Gail Hershatter
 Tin-Lun Ho
 Kay E. Holekamp
 Linda C. Hsieh-Wilson
 Maria D. Hummer-Tuttle
 Kay Bailey Hutchison
 Alberto Ibargüen
 Enrique Iglesia
 Allen F. Isaacman
 Feisal Amin Rasoul Istrabadi
 Nina G. Jablonski
 Kay Redfield Jamison
 John D. Joannopoulos
 Joan Jonas
 Eugenia Kalnay
 Hans Kamp
 Ravindran Kannan
 David B. Kaplan
 David Michael Karl
 Victoria M. Kaspi
 David Kleinfeld
 Peter J. Klenow
 James T. Kloppenberg
 Philip H. Knight
 Brian K. Kobilka
 Lewis A. Kornhauser
 Barbara Kruger
 Richard Kurin
 György Kurtág
 Michael J. Lenardo
 George E. Lewis
 Magnus Lindberg
 Margaret S. Livingstone
 Margaret Lock
 Wallace D. Loh
 Ann Lurie
 John Gordon MacFarlane
 David H. MacLennan
 Renu Malhotra
 Peter Mandler
 Michael Mann
 Kenneth J. Marians
 Tim Maudlin
 Jane Dammen McAuliffe
 James McBride
 Frank P. McCormick
 Audra A. McDonald
 Paul L. McEuen
 Nicholas W. McKeown
 Milbrey W. McLaughlin
 Francoise Meltzer
 Edward Mendelson
 William P. Minicozzi II
 David R. Morrison
 Janet A. Napolitano
 Philip Needleman
 Joseph Neubauer
 Karl J. Niklas
 Robert M. Nosofsky
 Robert L. Nussbaum
 Dennis D. M. O'Leary
 Paul A. Offit
 Murray Perahia
 Raymond T. Pierrehumbert
 Jill Pipher
 Christopher O. Plummer
 Christopher A. Prendergast
 Miroslav Radman
 Roger Ratcliff
 Philip J. Reny
 Keren D. Rice
 Rebecca R. Richards-Kortum
 Rebecca W. Rimel
 Douglas Rivers
 Valery A. Rubakov
 Alexander Rudensky
 Rubén G. Rumbaut
 Jenny Saffran
 Cristián T. Samper
 Alejandro Sánchez Alvarado
 Mark S. Schlissel
 Sandra L. Schmid
 Gregory R. Schopen
 David D. Shulman
 Stewart Shuman
 Joseph Sifakis
 Joan B. Silk
 Paul Slovic
 Michael P. Snyder
 David Stasavage
 James Stone
 Sharon Y. Strauss
 Teresa A. Sullivan
 David S. Tatel
 Roger M. Temam
 Kathleen Thelen
 Joseph Travis
 Donald G. Truhlar
 Neil deGrasse Tyson
 Johan van Benthem
 Gerhard Wagner
 Peter C. Wainwright
 Darren Walker
 Stephen T. Warren
 James A. Wells
 Ivan Werning
 Robin L. West
 Karen L. Wooley
 Carol M. Worthman
 Jay Jie Xu
 Wei Yang
 Ali Yazdani

2016 

 Ronny Abraham
 Diane Ackerman
 Andreas J. Albrecht
 Farooq Azam
 Chunli Bai
 Andrew E. Barshay
 Austin M. Beutner
 Manfred Bietak
 Bernard S. Black
 Donna Gail Blackmond
 Michael S. Brainard
 Horst Bredekamp
 Edythe L. Broad
 Keith W.T. Burridge
 Robert E. Buswell, Jr.
 Edwin Cameron
 Andrea Louise Campbell
 Brandice Canes-Wrone
 John Michael Carethers
 Jean M. Case
 Roger Chartier
 Erwin Chemerinsky
 Andrew J. Cherlin
 Victor Chernozhukov
 Michelene T.H. Chi
 Rey Chow
 Andrew G. Clark
 Tom C. Conley
 Fergus I.M. Craik
 Benjamin F. Cravatt III
 Thibault Damour
 Kathleen A. Deagan
 Jeffrey A. Dean
 Jeremy Denk
 Jill Dolan
 James R. Downing
 Jennifer L. Eberhardt
 Patricia Buckley Ebrey
 Richard H. Ebright
 Douglas J. Emlen
 Pavel Etingof
 Percival Everett
 Mathea Falco
 JoAnn Falletta
 Denis Feeney
 Tamar Flash
 Janet Franklin
 Hans-Joachim Freund
 Joshua A. Frieman
 Robert J. Full
 Gerald G. Fuller
 John Gabrieli
 Theaster Gates, Jr.
 R. Benny Gerber
 Sanjay Ghemawat
 Lila M. Gierasch
 Gerd Gigerenzer
 Margaret P. Gilbert
 Gary Gilliland
 Sander L. Gilman
 Robert M. Glaeser
 Robert Gober
 Robert L. Goldstone
 Robert A. Gottlieb
 Joanne S. Gowa
 M. Temple Grandin
 Steve Granick
 Donald K. Grayson
 Sanford D. Greenberg
 Sandra E. Greene
 Leslie Greengard
 Adam M. Habib
 Beatrice H. Hahn
 David P. Hajjar
 Sergiu Hart
 Terrance A. Hayes
 Carl-Henrik Heldin
 Antonia Hernandez
 Jacqueline Hewitt
 Ralph J. Hexter
 Donald Hilvert
 Marianne Hirsch
 Mellody L. Hobson
 Mark W. Hochstrasser
 Ary A. Hoffmann
 Heinz Robert Holliger
 Ali Hortacsu
 G. John Ikenberry
 Donald E. Ingber
 Nancy Y. Ip
 Walter Isaacson
 Barbara V. Jacak
 Steven E. Jacobsen
 Larry L. Jacoby
 Christopher Jarzynski
 Shelly Kagan
 Anna R. Karlin
 Kim Kashkashian
 Jay D. Keasling
 Robin D.G. Kelley
 Jeffery W. Kelly
 Joel Grant Kingsolver
 Jack Knight
 Janos Kollar
 Alex L. Kolodkin
 Yusef Komunyakaa
 Melvin J. Konner
 Samuel S. Kortum
 Chryssa Kouveliotou
 Bryna R. Kra
 Adrian R. Krainer
 Joachim Kupper
 M. Magdalene Lampert
 Carol D. Lee
 David L. Lee
 David W. Leebron
 Warren J. Leonard
 Ling Li
 Michael J. Lichten
 Glenn Ligon
 Ronald K. Linde
 Kuo-sung Liu
 Timothy P. Lodge
 Lawrence A. Loeb
 Gordon D. Logan
 Helen E. Longino
 Monica Cecilia Lozano
 Glen M. MacDonald
 Menachem Magidor
 M. Elizabeth Magill
 Ulrike Malmendier
 George M. Marsden
 Kelsey C. Martin
 Vann McGee
 Mark Alan McPeek
 Robert Brian Millard
 Scott J. Miller
 Tom M. Mitchell
 Russell A. Mittermeier
 Festus G. Mogae
 John T. Monahan
 Toshiko Mori
 Trevor Morrison
 Sendhil Mullainathan
 Carl F. Nathan
 Eric G. Neilson
 Carol Ann Newsom
 Christof Niehrs
 David Nirenberg
 Eva Nogales
 Jacqueline Novogratz
 Andrei Okounkov
 Hirosi Ooguri
 Sarah P. Otto
 Roberto D. Peccei
 Susan G. Pedersen
 James W. Pellegrino
 Rob Phillips
 Paul Pierson
 Mikhail Borisovich Piotrovskiy
 Terry A. Plank
 Jennifer J. Raab
 Tal D. Rabin
 Jahan Ramazani
 Mary Ann Rankin
 Debraj Ray
 Helene Rey
 Christopher A. Reynolds
 Louise M. Richardson
 Vladimir Rokhlin
 Bruce R. Rosen
 John L. R. Rubenstein
 Melanie S. Sanford
 Kim Lane Scheppele
 Robert J. Schoelkopf
 Peter H. Schuck
 Arthur I. Segel
 Joel Seligman
 Michael A. Sells
 Nicholas A. Serota
 Scott J. Shenker
 Yang Shi
 Wayne Shorter
 David E. Simpson
 Lorna Simpson
 Maynard E. Solomon
 David St. John
 James Stavridis
 Zeev Sternhell
 Thomas F. Stocker
 Lisa Tauxe
 Alan S. Taylor
 Colm Toibin
 George Tsebelis
 Shimon Ullman
 Anne M. Villeneuve
 Peter W. Voorhees
 Karen H. Vousden
 Isiah M. Warner
 Michael R. Wasielewski
 Elke U. Weber
 Ralph Weissleder
 Steven R. White
 Christopher S. Wood
 James F. Woodward
 Kevin L. Young
 Kongjian Yu
 Long Yu
 Oscar A. Zanetti

2017 

 Chimamanda Ngozi Adichie
 Aigboje Ihedero Aig-Imoukhuede
 Michael Aizenman
 Richard D. Alba
 James P. Allison
 Angelika Amon
 Thomas E. Anderson
 Ruth Arnon
 Nadine Aubry
 Hari Balakrishnan
 Richard G. Baraniuk
 Eugene Bardach
 Cynthia Barnhart
 Frank R. Baumgartner
 Jeremy M. Berg
 Per-Olof Berggren
 Manjul Bhargava
 Andre Bishop
 Gregory S. Boebinger
 Monika Boehm-Tettelbach
 Squire J. Booker
 David L. Boren
 William J. Borucki
 Janet M. Box-Steffensmeier
 Edward S. Boyden III
 David G. Bradley
 Caroline B. Brettell
 Elizabeth Broun
 Lester R. Brown
 Myles A. Brown
 Lonnie G. Bunch III
 Carol Burnett
 Ursula M. Burns
 Jerome R. Busemeyer
 Bradley R. Cairns
 Robin M. Canup
 Judith A. Carney
 Erick M. Carreira
 Dana Carroll
 Arturo Casadevall
 Anne C. Case
 Jamie H.D. Cate
 Gerald L. Chan
 Ronnie C. Chan
 Christopher J. Chang
 David Charbonneau
 Zhu Chen
 Nicholas A. Christakis
 Mary Louise Cleave
 Stephen T. Coate
 Dalton Conley
 Charles S. Craik
 David Damrosch
 Beverly Davidson
 Giovanni De Micheli
 Scott E. Denmark
 Everette E. Dennis Jr.
 Cheryl L. Dorsey
 Gregg Easterbrook
 Jonathan Eaton
 Kerry A. Emanuel
 Roger W. Falcone
 Russell H. Fazio
 Samuel R. Freeman
 Else Marie Friis
 Kathryn Scott Fuller
 Raghavendra Gadagkar
 Jeanne K. Gang
 Sumit Ganguly
 Alan M. Garber
 Maria Cristina Garcia
 Sergey Gavrilets
 Heather K. Gerken
 Gretchen Holbrook Gerzina
 Paula J. Giddings
 Karen I. Goldberg
 Francisco Goldman
 Andrea J. Goldsmith
 Joshua R. Goldstein
 Gabriela Gonzalez
 Amy Goodman
 Edmund W. Gordon
 Roland Greene
 Lenore A. Grenoble
 Clare P. Grey
 David Grossman
 Pamela Grossman
 Anna Grzymala-Busse
 Megan R. Gunnar
 John Guy
 Beverly Guy-Sheftall
 Janet Gyatso
 Jacob S. Hacker
 Christopher D. Hacon
 John Haffenden
 Takeshi Hamashita
 Brenda L. Hillman
 Sarah E. Hobbie
 Hopi E. Hoekstra
 Carl R. Holladay
 Kathleen C. Howell
 Salima Ikram
 Joichi Ito
 Torben Iversen
 Paul E. Jacobs
 Alison M. Jaggar
 Stephanie W. Jamison
 Maria Jasin
 Andrew R. Jassy
 Attahiru M. Jega
 Paula A. Johnson
 Peter A. Jones
 Leemor Joshua-Tor
 James T. Kadonaga
 Panagiotis Karkanas
 Elly T. Katabira
 Scott N. Keeney
 Darcy B. Kelley
 Diebedo Francis Kere
 Yannis G. Kevrekidis
 Pradeep K. Khosla
 Young-Kee Kim
 Sidney Kimmel
 Desmond King
 Barbara Kirshenblatt-Gimblett
 Roberta L. Klatzky
 Robert T. Knight
 Robert V. Kohn
 Marie-Josee Kravis
 Nicholas D. Kristof
 Jonathan Lear
 Ann L. Lee
 William F. Lee
 John Legend
 Christopher D. Lima
 Karolin Luger
 Akin Ladipo Mabogunje
 Greil Marcus
 Donald J. Mastronarde
 Nergis Mavalvala
 Helen S. Mayberg
 Jane M. Mayer
 Joseph-Achille Mbembe
 Ian M. McKellen
 John R. McNeill
 Marc J. Melitz
 Juanita L. Merchant
 Suzanne B. Mettler
 Earl K. Miller
 Richard K. Miller
 Charles W. Mills
 John C. Mitchell
 W. J. Thomas Mitchell
 M. Granger Morgan
 Craig Moritz
 Mona Nemer
 William T. Newsome III
 Rohini Nilekani
 Lynn Nottage
 Evgeny Nudler
 Ronald L. Olson
 Naomi Oreskes
 Carlo Maria Ossola
 N. Geoffrey Parker
 Alina A. Payne
 Nicholas A. Peppas
 Nancy Beth Peretsman
 Carter G. Phillips
 Jean-Paul Poirier
 Mary C. Potter
 Romano Prodi
 Martin Quack
 John Quelch
 Jeroen G. W. Raaijmakers
 Valerie A. Ramey
 Rino Rappuoli
 Richard W. Rapson
 Sean F. Reardon
 John R. Rickford
 Faith Ringgold
 Luigi Rizzi
 Dana L. Robert
 Paul B. Rothman
 N. C. Jacob Rothschild
 Daniela Rus
 Ghassan Salame
 Peter Schafer
 Paul L. Schechter
 Eric Schickler
 Fred B. Schneider
 Nadrian C. Seeman
 Ilya R. Segal
 Vera Serganova
 Eldar Shafir
 Zhixun Shen
 Dean Sheppard
 Pamela A. Silver
 Johannes N. Sjostrand
 Matthew J. Slaughter
 Mark S. Slobin
 Douglas E. Soltis
 Pamela S. Soltis
 Suzanne T. Staggs
 Randall L. Stephenson
 Kathryn D. Sullivan
 Arthur C. Sze
 Keith S. Thomson
 Michael Tomasello
 Emanuel Tov
 Mark Neil Trahant
 George G. Triantis
 Robert Tycko
 Mark Volpe
 Peter M. Warren
 André Watts
 Mark Westoby
 James Q. Whitman
 Michael Witherell
 Björn Wittrock
 Tim Wu
 Tadataka Yamada
 J. Frank Yates
 Katherine A. Yelick
 Tara E. Zahra
 Jonathan L. Zittrain
 Marlene Zuk

2018 

 Aileen C. Adams
 Natalie G. Ahn
 Hilal Ali Al-Hinai
 Lilli Alanen
 Fernando E. Alvarez
 R. Michael Alvarez
 Leif Andersson
 Robert Audi
 Katherine Baicker
 Leon Balents
 Dan Balz
 Lisa Feldman Barrett
 Jocelyn Bell Burnell
 Myma A. Belo-Osagie
 Marc R. Benioff
 Darwin K. Berg
 Joanne Berger-Sweeney
 Lauren Berlant
 Helen M. Berman
 Sue Biggins
 Carla Bley
 Deborah A. Borda
 Alexei Borodin
 Philippe Bourgois
 John R. Bowen
 Bernard R. Boxill
 Anthony P. Bretscher
 Eric A. Brewer
 C. Jeffrey Brinker
 Bill Brown
 Bruce Buffett
 Ian Buruma
 Laurie J. Butler
 David N. Cannadine
 Xuetao Cao
 Sylvain E. Cappell
 Gang Chen
 Robert B. Cialdini
 Helen E. Clark
 Ta-Nehisi Coates
 Cathy J. Cohen
 Deborah A. Cohen
 John J. Collins
 Roger D. Cone
 Mariano-Florentino Cuéllar
 Ana Maria Cuervo
 Jason G. Cyster
 Patricia A. D'Amore
 Christian Davenport
 Jill G. de Villiers
 James W. Demmel
 Susan M. Dymecki
 Timothy Egan
 Judith S. Eisen
 Deborah Eisenberg
 Linda T. Elkins-Tanton
 Charles D. Ellis
 Ezekiel J. Emanuel
 Randall W. Engle
 Juan Enriquez
 Ora Entin-Wohlman
 Katherine Farley
 Steven Feierman
 Paula E. Findlen
 Gary Alan Fine
 
 David Fitzpatrick
 Stephen R. Forrest
 Jeffry A. Frieden
 Cynthia M. Friend
 Judith Frydman
 Tedros A. Ghebreyesus
 Tim Giago
 Simon E. Gikandi
 Itzhak Gilboa
 Rosemary G. Gillespie
 Paul Gilroy
 Thelma Golden
 Risa L. Goluboff
 Robert Gooding-Williams
 Gita Gopinath
 Michael Govan
 Michael R. Green
 Angela M. Gronenborn
 Leonidas J. Guibas
 Larry D. Guth
 Tom Hanks
 J. Wade Harper
 Michael E. Hasselmo
 W. Reed Hastings, Jr.
 Craig J. Hawker
 Carla D. Hayden
 Daniel Heller-Roazen
 Rebecca M. Henderson
 Matthias W. Hentze
 Marillyn A. Hewson
 Evelyn Brooks Higginbotham
 Julia B. Hirschberg
 Reid G. Hoffman
 Jennifer Hornsby
 Peter Jay Hotez
 Hilary W. Hoynes
 Rexhep Ismajli
 Allan S. Jacobson
 Heinrich M. Jaeger
 Svetlana Jitomirskaya
 Renata Kallosh
 Matthew T. Kapstein
 Henry C. Kapteyn
 Robert L. Kendrick
 Sara Kiesler
 Jacqueline M. King
 Patricia W. Kitcher
 Gabor Klaniczay
 Maurice Kleman
 Sandra Knapp
 Martti Koskenniemi
 Tony Kouzarides
 Chapurukha M. Kusimba
 Marta Kutas
 Gloria Ladson-Billings
 Robert Landick
 Mark A. Lemley
 Roger N. Lemon
 Tania León
 Robert W. Levenson
 Susan C. Levine
 Haifan Lin
 Dahlia Lithwick
 Jianguo Liu
 K. Tsianina Lomawaima
 Catherine Lord
 Nathaniel Mackey
 Marc Mangel
 Henrietta Mann
 Johanna Mappes
 Pablo A. Marquet
 Rosa L. Matzkin
 Tali Mendelberg
 David W. Miliband
 Joseph C. Miller
 Kazuo Miyamoto
 Anthony P. Monaco
 Esther D. Mwaikambo
 Arkadi S. Nemirovski
 Viet Thanh Nguyen
 H. Frederik Nijhout
 Pippa Norris
 Barack H. Obama
 Elaine S. Oran
 Eduardo J. Padron
 Claire L. Parkinson
 Parag A. Pathak
 Anne Woods Patterson
 Laurie L. Patton
 David H. Perlmutter
 Naomi E. Pierce
 David J. Pine
 Richard J. Powell
 Laurene Powell Jobs
 Eliot Quataert
 Andrew F. Read
 David R. Reichman
 Susanne S. Renner
 Andrea Rinaldo
 Nancy L. Rose
 Ellen V. Rothenberg
 Leigh H. Royden
 Deborah F. Rutter
 Osamu Saito
 Steven L. Salzberg
 Guillermo R. Sapiro
 Debra Satz
 Malcolm Schofield
 Ivan K. Schuller
 Sara Seager
 Ruth G. Shaw
 Richard Shiff
 Gerald I. Shulman
 Jorge L. Soberon
 Gurindar S. Sohi
 Sonia Sotomayor
 Jacqueline Stewart
 Jessica Stockholder
 Jacqueline Stone
 Melody Ann Swartz
 Lorraine S. Symington
 Diana Taylor
 Edward E. Telles
 Andrei Tokmakoff
 F. Dean Toste
 Khaled Toukan
 Rebecca E. Traister
 Robert H. Tuttle
 Ann Twinam
 Linda J. Waite
 Christopher A. Walsh
 Robert Warrior
 K. Birgitta Whaley
 Joy Williams
 Paul H. Wise
 Damian Woetzel
 Richard D. Wood
 Joanna K. Wysocka
 H. Peyton Young
 Xingpei Yuan
 Francesca Zambello
 Feng Zhang
 Huda Y. Zoghbi

2019 

 Susan L. Ackerman
 Zeid Ra'ad Al Hussein
 Haifa Reda Jamal Al-Lail
 Elizabeth Alexander
 Anita LaFrance Allen
 Fred W. Allendorf
 Valerie A. Amos
 Kristi S. Anseth
 Dimitri A. Antoniadis
 Natsuki Aruga
 Alan Ashworth
 Patricia Barber
 Rachel E. Barkow
 Natalie M. Batalha
 Edward Baugh
 Emily Bazelon
 Marlene Behrmann
 Francine D. Berman
 Rene Bernards
 Nora Berrah
 Donald M. Berwick
 Francisco Bezanilla
 Sebastian Bonhoeffer
 Samuel S. Bowles
 Mark Bradford
 Derek E.G. Briggs
 Jane E. Buikstra
 Alison Butler
 Judith Butler
 José Ignacio Cabezón
 Candis Callison
 Clare Cavanagh
 Stephen J. Ceci
 Anantha P. Chandrakasan
 Joyce E. Chaplin
 Xiaohong Chen
 Yifan Cheng
 Eugene Chiang
 Melanie H. Cobb
 Katherine J. Cramer
 Jennifer Crocker
 Aliko Dangote
 Mitchell E. Daniels
 Donald J. Darensbourg
 Robert B. Darnell
 Nancy E. Davidson
 Sean M. Decatur
 Gabrielle Demange
 Souleymane Bachir Diagne
 Leah Dickerman
 Ivan Đikić
 Richard Durbin
 Enrique D. Dussel
 Kathryn Edin
 Harry J. Elam Jr.
 Debra M. Elmegreen
 Adam F. Falk
 James M. Fallows
 Guoping Feng
 Jonathan E. Franzen
 Nancy Fraser
 Jody Freeman
 Bojie Fu
 Ann M. Fudge
 Gerald Gabrielse
 Denise A. Galloway
 Huajian Gao
 Merrick B. Garland
 Patrick J. Geary
 Benjamin Geiger
 Michele J. Gelfand
 Jeff Gelles
 Clark Glymour
 Susan R. Goldman
 Judith L. Goldstein
 Rachel Green
 John P. Grotzinger
 Jean-Marie Guéhenno
 Jonathan Haidt
 Peter A. Hall
 Jo Handelsman
 Kathleen Mullan Harris
 Michael H. Harris
 Molly Haskell
 Jane Hirshfield
 Jonathan S. Holloway
 Keith J. Holyoak
 Susan S. Hubbard
 Sherrilyn Ifill
 Holly A. Ingraham
 Nobutaka Inoue
 Brad Inwood
 Margaret D. Jacobs
 Thomas P. Jenuwein
 Yishi Jin
 Mark H. Johnson
 Charles I. Jones
 Kellie Jones
 Robert J. Jones
 Mark D. Jordan
 Barbara B. Kahn
 David R. Karger
 Nadira D. Karunaweera
 Brian W. Kernighan
 Ronald C. Kessler
 Declan Kiberd
 Kenneth W. Kinzler
 David L. Kirp
 Daniel J. Klionsky
 Christopher W. Kuzawa
 Eliana La Ferrara
 Richard W. Lariviere
 Cato T. Laurencin
 Asunción Lavrin
 Eusebio Leal Spengler
 Frances E. Lee
 Judith M. Lieu
 Jennifer Lippincott-Schwartz
 Goodwin H. Liu
 Patty Loew
 Jeffrey R. Long
 Edna Longley
 Kam-Biu Luk
 Ellen Lupton
 Mikhail Lyubich
 Jodi Magness
 Kishore Mahbubani
 Brenda Major
 James Manyika
 Donald Margulies
 Carlos Marichal
 Michel D. Martin
 Kathleen McKeown
 Sara McLanahan
 Tracey L. Meares
 Konstantinos E.D. Meghir
 Bert W. Meijer
 Axel Meyer
 Danesh Moazed
 Edward B. Montgomery
 Melissa Moore
 Catherine J. Murphy
 N.R. Narayana Murthy
 Emi Nakamura
 Jacques Neefs
 Maggie Nelson
 Nandan Nilekani
 Suzanne M. Nora Johnson
 Michelle L. R. Obama
 Carol J. Oja
 Ngozi Okonjo-Iweala
 Jane T. Olson
 Richard S. Ostfeld
 Joseph W. Palca
 Timothy N. Palmer
 Mercedes Pascual
 Deval L. Patrick
 Roy D. Pea
 Nathaniel Persily
 Dianne M. Pinderhughes
 Mary Louise Pratt
 Daniel J. Rader
 Mark D. Rausher
 Charles H. Robbins
 Bryan L. Roth
 William T. Rowe
 James E. Ryan
 Subir Sachdev
 Daniel P. Schrag
 Kristin Scott
 Rachel A. Segalman
 Sylvia Serfaty
 Chris Shannon
 Tommie Shelby
 Michael J. Shelley
 Richard Shine
 Mona Siddiqui
 Eero P. Simoncelli
 Marietta Simpson
 Anna Deavere Smith
 David F. Smuts
 
 Margaret Beale Spencer
 Fiona J. Stanley
 Claire E. Sterk
 Patricia A. Thiel
 Lonnie G. Thompson
 Claire J. Tomlin
 Joe William Trotter, Jr.
 Paul E. Turner
 David H. Vanderbilt
 András Vasy
 Gordana Vunjak-Novakovic
 Kenneth W. Warren
 Detlef Weigel
 Adam D. Weinberg
 Judith Weisenfeld
 Steven I. Wilkinson
 John T. Wixted
 Cynthia Wolberger
 Jeremy M. Wolfe
 Walt Wolfram
 Hansjörg Wyss
 Nobuyuki Yoshida
 Hirokazu Yoshikawa
 Clare C. Yu
 Jin-Quan Yu
 Daniel Zajfman
 Virginia A. Zakian
 Kelly R. Zamudio
 Ofer Zeitouni
 Ya-Qin Zhang

References 

2006